Karl-Axel "Kalle" Sundqvist (born 29 November 1962) is a Swedish sprint canoeist who competed from the mid-1980s to the early 1990s. Competing in three Summer Olympics, he won a silver medal in the K-2 1000 m event at Barcelona in 1992.

Sundqvist also won ten medals at the ICF Canoe Sprint World Championships with a gold (K-4 1000 m: 1985), two silvers (K-2 10000 m: 1993, K-4 1000 m: 1987), and seven bronzes (K-1 1000 m: 1985, 1989; K-2 500 m: 1987, K-2 1000 m: 1993, K-2 10000 m: 1983, K-4 500 m: 1985, K-4 10000 m: 1990).

References

1962 births
Canoeists at the 1984 Summer Olympics
Canoeists at the 1988 Summer Olympics
Canoeists at the 1992 Summer Olympics
Living people
Olympic canoeists of Sweden
Olympic silver medalists for Sweden
Swedish male canoeists
Olympic medalists in canoeing
ICF Canoe Sprint World Championships medalists in kayak
Medalists at the 1992 Summer Olympics